Portable stereo may refer to:
personal stereo, such as the Sony Walkman
boombox, sometimes called a "ghetto blaster"